The Palace of Justice in Cluj-Napoca, on Dorobanţilor Street, no.2, is an eclectic structure, built between 1898 and 1902, after the plans of the association Epitotarsasag, Kotsis, Smiel, Fodor es Reisinger.

The quadrilateral building, with its 13 inner yards is a part of the ensemble in Avram Iancu Square, together with the Romanian Opera, the CFR Palace, the Palace of the Prefecture, the Palace of Finance and the Palace of the Orthodox Metropolis.

References

Buildings and structures in Cluj-Napoca